Nino Salia née Kurtsikashvili (October 15, 1898 – 1992) was a Georgian émigré historian and philologist active in France, and the wife of the historian Kalistrat Salia.

Born in Kakheti, eastern Georgia, she was educated at Tbilisi and St. Petersburg. During World War I, she served as a nurse. After the Soviet takeover of Georgia, she lived in France where she, together with her husband, edited the journal Bedi Kartlisa dedicated to the Kartvelian studies. Salia published several works on the history and culture of Georgia, and coauthored "Georgia" (Historical-Cultural Review) along with K. Salia and V. Beridze. Later in her life, she presented her unique library to the Institute of Manuscripts of Georgia.

References 
The Memorial Room of Nino and Kalistrate Salias. Georgian National Center of Manuscripts
Salia, Nino. Georgia: An Introduction. A Review of Georgian and Caucasian Studies, Paris, 1975.

1898 births
1992 deaths
Philologists from Georgia (country)
20th-century historians from Georgia (country)
Women writers from Georgia (country)
20th-century philologists
White Russian emigrants to France